Trude (German: Trude, die Sechzehnjährige) is a 1926 German silent film directed by Conrad Wiene and starring Olga Chekhova, Max Landa and Paul Morgan.

The film's sets were designed by the art director Robert A. Dietrich.

Cast
 Olga Chekhova 
 Max Landa
 Paul Morgan 
 Anny Ondra 
 Adele Sandrock 
 Jack Trevor 
 Henry Bender 
 Karl Platen
 Albert Paulig
 Olga Engl		
 Karl Victor Plagge	
 Ernst Rückert

References

Bibliography
 Hans-Michael Bock and Tim Bergfelder. The Concise Cinegraph: An Encyclopedia of German Cinema. Berghahn Books.

External links

1926 films
Films of the Weimar Republic
German silent feature films
Films directed by Conrad Wiene
German black-and-white films